{{DISPLAYTITLE:C9H11N5O4}}
The molecular formula C9H11N5O4 may refer to:

 Eritadenine, a chemical compound found in shiitake mushrooms
 Neopterin, a catabolic product of guanosine triphosphate